The Georgetown Leadership Seminar (GLS) is an annual gathering of selected rising leaders from around the world for a week of intensive discussion on major international issues. The program was established in 1982 by Georgetown University in order to promote dialogue among individuals who would shape the futures of their countries. GLS attracts individuals from government, corporations, law firms, financial institutions, the military, international organizations, NGOs, the media, universities, think tanks, and elsewhere who occupy positions of influence and have the potential to move up to greater leadership roles. The selected participants are then exposed to the major global issues and the Washington foreign policy-making process through direct contact with top level policy makers and experts. The program is derived from Harvard’s “international seminar” conducted by Henry Kissinger in the 1950s and 1960s. The GLS is now administered by the Institute for the Study of Diplomacy at the School of Foreign Service at Georgetown. Original committee members included Zbigniew Brzezinski, Madeleine Albright, Henry Kissinger, and Peter F. Krogh.

Objectives 

The core belief underlying the GLS is that successful leaders in a globalized world must continually work to improve their understanding of international affairs and connect to an international network. This is accomplished through three distinct goals:

 To promote an exchange of views among emerging public and private sector leaders on key global issues of the future.
 To establish the personal contacts and sense of camaraderie essential to effective international cooperation. 
 To improve understanding by foreign leaders of the perspectives and foreign policy-making process through direct contact with key policy-makers, academics, and other experts in Washington.

Notable Speakers 

Since 1982, the GLS has attracted a variety of speakers who have served in important policy-making and business roles:

 Madeleine Albright - U.S. Secretary of State in the Clinton Administration
 Senator Chuck Hagel - Former Senator of Nebraska and U.S. Secretary of Defense
 Andrew Natsios - Former Administrator of USAID  
 Alice Rivlin - Former Vice Chairman of the Federal Reserve   
 Paul Begala - American political commentator  
 Chester Crocker – Assistant Secretary of State for African Affairs  
 Peter Krogh - Dean of the Edmund A. Walsh School of Foreign Service at Georgetown University  
 Robert Gallucci - Dean of the Edmund A. Walsh School of Foreign Service at Georgetown University; President of the John D. and Catherine T. MacArthur Foundation   
 Carol Lancaster - Dean of the Edmund A. Walsh School of Foreign Service at Georgetown University 
 Shashi Tharoor – United Nations Under-Secretary General and Member of Parliament of India
 John DeGioia - President of Georgetown University  
 Paul Erdman - Financial Writer and Scholar  
 Francois Bourguignon - Chief Economist of the World Bank  
 Mitchell Reiss – Special Envoy to Northern Ireland 
 Charles Cook - American political analyst  
 Victor Cha - Director for Asian Affairs at the National Security Council and Georgetown University professor  
 George Tenet - Director of the CIA  
 Thomas Pickering – US Ambassador to the United Nations

Select Alumni 

GLS has over 800 alumni from more than 100 countries, including presidents, prime ministers, cabinet secretaries, generals, ambassadors, and CEOs:

 Vincent Siew - (GLS 1982) former Prime Minister and former Vice President of Taiwan
 Thomas D. Boyatt- (GLS 1983) former diplomat and United States Ambassador to Burkina Faso (1978–80) and Colombia (1980–83)
 Alain Juppe - (GLS 1983) former Foreign Minister and former Prime Minister of France
 Jaswant Singh - (GLS 1983) Indian Member of Parliament, former Minister of Finance, Minister of Defense, and Minister of External Affairs of India
 Roberto Dañino - (GLS 1983) former Prime Minister of Peru
 Michael Howard - (GLS 1983)  British  Leader of the Conservative Party and Leader of the Opposition
 Ritt Bjerregaard - (GLS 1984) former Danish politician and was the first female Lord Mayor of Copenhagen
 César Gaviria Trujillo - (GLS 1984) former Secretary General of the Organization of American States, former President of Colombia
 Patricia M. Byrne - (GLS 1984) served as United States Ambassador to Burma and United States Ambassador to Mali
 Michael Huffington- (GlS 1984) former U.S. Congressman from the 22nd district of California
 Juwono Sudarsono - (GLS 1985) former Defense Minister of Indonesia
 Helle Degn - (GLS 1985) Danish politician
 James Goodby - (GLS 1985) author and former American diplomat as United States Ambassador to Finland
 Yossi Beilin - (GLS 1986) Israeli statesman and scholar that has served as Minister of Economics and Planning, Minister of Justice, and Minister of Religious Affairs
 Anura Bandaranaike - (GLS 1987) Former Cabinet Minister of Foreign Affairs, Higher Education, Tourism and National Heritage and former Speaker of the Parliament of Sri Lanka
 Mary Collins - (GLS 1987) former Canadian Minister of National Health and Welfare
 In Jaw Lai - (GLS 1987) former President of the Judicial Yuan and Chief Justice of the Court of Taiwan
 Jens Stoltenberg - (GLS 1988) Current Prime Minister and former Finance Minister of Norway
 Jean-Marie Guehenno - (GLS 1989) former Undersecretary General of the United Nations
 Sondhi Limthongkul - (GLS 1991) Inaugural Leader of the New Politics Party of Thailand
 General Peter Pace - (GLS 1992) former Chairman of the Joint Chiefs of Staff
 Frances Fitzgerald - Irish Fine Gael politician and the Minister for Children and Youth Affairs
 Jose Barroso - (GLS 1998) President of EU Commission and former Prime Minister of Portugal
 Michael Hayden - (GLS 1999) former Director of the CIA and former Director of the NSA
 Felipe de Borbon - (GLS 1999) Prince of Asturias; Heir Apparent to the Spanish Throne
 Martin Redrado - (GLS 1999) Former President of the Central Bank of Argentina
 Isaac Lee Possin - (GLS 1999) President of News for Univision
 Giorgi Baramidze - Georgian politician who served as Vice-Prime Minister of Georgia and State Minister for Euro-Atlantic Integration
 Kayode Fayemi - (GLS 2000) Governor of Ekiti State, Nigeria
 Moushira Khattab (GLS 2001)- former Minister of Family & Population of Egypt, Ambassador of Egypt to the Republic of South Africa, the Czech Republic and Slovakia
 Henrique Capriles Radonski - (GLS 2002) Opposition candidate in the 2012 Venezuelan presidential election
 Mahmoud Mohieldin - (GLS 2003) Managing Director of the World Bank, former Egyptian Minister of Investment
 Nasser Judeh - (GLS 2004) Jordanian Minister of Foreign Affairs
 Maung Zarni - (GLS 2004) Burmese democracy activist; founder of the Free Burma Coalition
 David M. Rodriguez - (GLS 2004) United States Army General who currently serves as the Commander, United States Africa Command (AFRICOM)
 Muhamad Chatib Basri - (GLS 2005) is the Indonesian Minister of Finance
 Nuhu Ribadu - (GLS 2006) Chairman of the Petroleum Revenue Task Force and former Nigerian government anti-corruption official; Nigerian presidential candidate
 Anne Lammila - (GLS 2007) Finland’s Ambassador to Mexico
 Yousef Al-Otaiba - (GLS 2007) UAE Ambassador to the United States
 Ragnheiður Elín Árnadóttir - (GLS 2007) Icelandic politician and the Minister of Industry and Commerce
 Laila Iskander - (GLS 2007) Egyptian social entrepreneur and politician and Egypt's Minister of State for Environment Affairs 
 Donald Duke - (GLS 2008) Governor of the Cross River State of Nigeria
 Fatemeh Haghighatjoo - (GLS 2009) Reformist and member of the Iranian Parliament
 Tomasz Misiak – (GLS 2010) Polish Senator
 Ignacio Bustamante - (GLS 2011) CEO of Hochschild Mining (Peru)
 Abdelmalek Kettani - (GLS 2006) Ambassador of the Kingdom of Morocco to the Republic of Ivory Coast (2016-current)

References 

http://gls.georgetown.edu/about/
http://isd.georgetown.edu/
http://sfs.georgetown.edu/

Further reading
Seth P. Tillman, Georgetown's School of Foreign Service: the first 75 years, Edmund A. Walsh School of Foreign Service, Georgetown University, 1994 .

Academic conferences
Georgetown University programs